Futami-ura is a sub-bay or inlet of Ise Bay in Japan, where the Isuzu River enters the bay. It is located in Mie prefecture, in the southern part of the country, 300 km southwest of Tokyo.

It is where the famous Meoto Iwa rocks are found

Description
Futami-ura is a delta formed at the mouth of the Isuzu River that flows into Ise Bay. It has sometimes served as a site for ritual purification (misogi) prior to worshiping at Ise Jingu.

A rock formation called Meoto Iwa, which is within the precincts of Futamiokitama Shrine in Tateishizaki, is a well-know geological feature with significance to Shinto devotees.

Climate
The climate is temperate. The average temperature is 14 °C. The warmest month is July, at 23 °C, and the coldest January, at 5 °C. The average rainfall is 2,387 millimeters per year. The wettest month is June, with 316 millimeters of rain, and the wettest January, with 60 millimeters.

Town 
 was a town in Watarai District, Mie Prefecture, Japan. As of 2003, the town had an estimated population of 9,008 and a density of 754.44 persons per km². The total area was 11.94 km². On November 1, 2005, Futami, along with the town of Obata, and the village of Misono (all from Watarai District), were merged into the expanded city of Ise and thus no longer exists as an independent municipality.

The Meoto Iwa are two "wedded rocks", in the sea by the town.  Futami is mentioned by Matsuo Bashō in his haiku hamaguri no / futami ni wakare / yuku aki zo. Literally, Hamaguri clams of Futami break apart in Autumn. Poetically,

As firmly cemented clam shells

Fall apart in Autumn

So too, I take to the road again

Futaminoura Beach 
Futamiura Beach was opened in 1881 ( Meiji 15) by the first Surgeon general , Matsumoto Ryōjun , and was designated by the Director of the Ministry of Home Affairs, Sanitation Bureau, Nagayo in 1882 (Meiji 16), the first officially recognized beach in Japan. It is said that Emperor Taisho also trained in swimming when he was a child. At that time, the sea bathing was for medical purposes (bath digging), and there were cold baths that went into the sea and hot baths that were soaked in seawater warmed by a bathtub on the beach. Including, the inn town that sings Shioyuji was formed

Guest house 
There is a guest house  located in the area. It was designated a tangible cultural property designated by Mie Prefecture on March 17, 2004.  It was designated a national important cultural property on June 29, 2010 .

External links

 Official website of Ise

Sources 

Dissolved municipalities of Mie Prefecture
Landforms of Mie Prefecture
River deltas of Asia
Beaches of Japan